The Four Musketeers is a 1963 Italian-French adventure-comedy film co-written and directed  by Carlo Ludovico Bragaglia and starring Aldo Fabrizi, Erminio Macario and Nino Taranto. It is a loose parody of  Alexandre Dumas' The Three Musketeers.

Plot

Cast
Aldo Fabrizi as Bouboule
Erminio Macario as Dubois
Nino Taranto as Frisson
Carlo Croccolo as Lapin
Peppino De Filippo as Cardinal Richelieu
Carla Marlier as Costanza Bonacieux
Béatrice Altariba as  Queen Anne of Austria
Lisa Gastoni as Milady de Winter
Alberto Bonucci as Cyrano de Bergerac
Francesco Mulè as Louis XIII
Georges Rivière as D'Artagnan
Nando Poggi as Athos
Betto Di Paolo as Aramis
Andrea Aureli as Porthos
Franco Ressel as Lord Buckingham
Nino Terzo as Rochefort
John Francis Lane as Bonacieux
Anna Campori as Marianna 
Milena Vukotic as Milady's Maid

Release
The Four Musketeers was released in 1963.

Notes

References

External links

1960s adventure comedy films
Italian adventure comedy films
French adventure comedy films
Films based on The Three Musketeers
Films directed by Carlo Ludovico Bragaglia
Films scored by Gianni Ferrio
1960s historical adventure films
French historical adventure films
Italian historical adventure films
Titanus films
1960s historical comedy films
French historical comedy films
Italian historical comedy films
1963 comedy films
1963 films
1960s French films
1960s Italian films